Necropolis, They Will Be Ashes But Still Will Feel (Spanish: Necrópolis, serán ceniza mas tendrá sentido) is a 2016 Mexican horror short film directed by Mateo Granillo. The film premiered at the Buenos Aires Rojo Sangre in November 2016, and is stars Harold Torres, Mauro Sánchez Navarro, and Meraqui Pradis.

Plot 
Andrés (Mauro Sánchez Navarro), a young man devastated by the death of his beloved Eva, makes a bet with a ghost: if he manages to go through several trials in the world of the dead, he can revive her. If not, you will have to give him one of his eyes.

Cast 
 Harold Torres as Ghost
 Mauro Sánchez Navarro as Andrés
 Meraqui Pradis as Eva
 Mateo Granillo as Dead 3

References

External links 
 

Mexican ghost films
Mexican short films
2010s Mexican films